= Balagrus =

Ancient Greek writer

Balagrus (Ancient Greek: Bάλαγρoς) was a Greek writer of uncertain date, who wrote a work on the kingdom of Macedonia (Μακεδονικά) in two books at least.

He perhaps lived in the 3rd century BCE, as would appear from the only external testimony about him, an inscription from Pergamon, in which he is said to be the son of Meleager.
